Galvany is a surname. Notable people with the surname include:

 Maria Galvany (1878–1944), Spanish coloratura soprano
 Marisa Galvany (born 1936), American soprano